The list of ship launches in 1962 includes a chronological list of all ships launched in 1962.


References

Sources

1962
Ship launches